The Dry Branch Fire Squad is an American traditional-style bluegrass band from Virginia, which is fronted by Ron Thomason. The band is known for its showy performances and for Thomason's humorous interludes.  The Dry Branch Fire Squad is the host band of Grey Fox Bluegrass Festival, formerly called the Winterhawk Bluegrass Festival.  The band also hosts the High Mountain Hay Fever festival in Colorado as a fundraiser for a local medical clinic.

History
Dry Branch Fire Squad was founded by Thomason, a former member of the Clinch Mountain Boys, in October 1976.  It is named for a small town in Southwest Virginia where Thomason was born. The band has gone through many lineup changes; Thomason has been the one constant, serving as the band's MC, lead singer, and mandolin player.  He also plays banjo and guitar on occasion, and during performances often demonstrates hambone technique which he learned as a child.

In 1978 the band released a self-titled debut album, and in 1979 they performed at Bill Monroe's Bean Blossom Festival.

In 1981 the Dry Branch Fire Squad signed with Rounder Records, and released the first of many recordings with that label.

In 1984 the band began hosting the newly organized Winterhawk Bluegrass Festival.

At one time banjoist Bill Evans and singer Suzanne Thomas performed and recorded with the band.
 
The band has performed at the annual Hardly Strictly Bluegrass festival at Golden Gate Park in San Francisco every year since 2003. 

Long-time members Brian Aldridge and Dan Russell retired at the end of 2015. Former member, Adam McIntosh, rejoined the band playing guitar and mandolin and assuming tenor singing duties. Jeff Byrd also joined replacing Dan Russell on bass.

In 2016 band is composed of Adam McIntosh (guitar, mandolin), Tom Boyd (banjo, resophonic guitar), Jeff Byrd (bass), and Ron Thomason (mandolin, banjo, guitar). 

In 2017 a performance by the band was filmed for inclusion in the film Bluegrass Court Jester.

The Dry Branch Fire Squad is a regular at the Gettysburg Bluegrass Festival, and has been the opening act for the Sunday morning gospel set for every single year, twice per summer, since the festival began, totaling 40 years and 80 festivals. After a break for COVID year, Dry Branch Fire Squad is slated to resume their record for the 81st festival in May of 2021.

Selected recordings 
 The Dry Branch Fire Squad - 1978
 On Tour - Live at the Gettysburg Bluegrass Festival - 1979
 Born to Be Lonesome - 1981
 Antiques and Inventions - 1981
 Fannin' the Flames - 1982
 Good Neighbors and Friends - 1985
 Golgotha - 1986
 Tried and True - 1987
 Fertile Ground - 1989
 Long Journey - 1991
 Just for the Record - 1993
 Live! at Last - 1996
 Memories That Bless and Burn - 1999
 Hand-Hewn - 2001
 Live at the Newburyport Firehouse - 2005
 Thirtieth Anniversary Special - 2007
 Echoes of the Mountains - 2009
 The Gospel Way - 2014
 Don't Forget This Song - 2014

References

External links
 Dry Branch Fire Squad homepage
 Grey Fox Music Festival
 Dry Branch Fire Squad at the Hardly Strictly Bluegrass festival

American bluegrass music groups
Musical groups established in 1976
Musical groups from Virginia